The South American University Games is multi-sport event between student athletes from South American countries. It is organised by the Confederación Sudamericana Universitaria de Deportes (COSUD, South American Confederation of University Sport) and was first held in 2004 to provide additional competition for South Americans athletes before the global Universiade meeting.

It was originally scheduled on a quadrennial basis, but since 2010 it has been held irregularly. The Pan American University Games was founded in 2018 and the South American event has been scheduled in odd-numbered years since then.

Editions

Sports

Programme

References

Recurring sporting events established in 2004
Student sports competitions
Multi-sport events in South America
Quadrennial sporting events